is a former Japanese football player.

Club career
Yoshida was born in Misato, Kumamoto on February 10, 1990. After graduating from high school, he joined his local club Roasso Kumamoto in 2008. Although he was newcomer, he wore the number "1" shirt for the club and played many matches. However his opportunity to play decreased in 2009 and he retired end of 2009 season.

National team career
In August 2007, Yoshida was elected Japan U-17 national team for 2007 U-17 World Cup. But he did not play in the match, as he was the team's reserve goalkeeper behind Ryotaro Hironaga.

Club statistics

References

External links

1990 births
Living people
Association football people from Kumamoto Prefecture
Japanese footballers
J2 League players
Roasso Kumamoto players
Association football goalkeepers